António José Pereira de Carvalho (born 10 December 1960 in Guimarães) is a Portuguese former footballer who played as a midfielder or a left back, and is a current manager.

External links

1960 births
Living people
Sportspeople from Guimarães
Portuguese footballers
Association football defenders
Association football midfielders
Primeira Liga players
Liga Portugal 2 players
Segunda Divisão players
Vitória S.C. players
A.D. Sanjoanense players
S.C. Salgueiros players
Portimonense S.C. players
F.C. Paços de Ferreira players
Moreirense F.C. players
Portugal youth international footballers
Portugal international footballers
Portuguese football managers
S.C. Dragões Sandinenses managers